Swan Lake is the name of two lakes in the Northland Region of New Zealand.

See also
List of lakes in New Zealand

References

Lakes of the Northland Region
Far North District